Imelda Namutebi (born in 1970) is a Ugandan pastor and she is the senior pastor of Liberty Worship Centre, Lugala.

Background and education 
She was born to  her late father and mother  Mr and Mrs Wayita  and Rosemary Nakakawa in Busujju Mawanda, Butambala in central Uganda the Buganda region and she was the second born out the two children.  After dropping out of school in Primary five she joined the Bible school at Kayanja Ministries.

Career 
On 3 May 2014, Pastor Imelda opened up a multi-million dollar church located 5 miles west of Kampala, the capital city of  Uganda. The cathedral has over 15,000 seats and cost over 7 billion Ugandan shillings. The cathedral  built by her congregation sits on 17 acres and has her feminine touch in many places, such as pretty floral lampshades in different shades of fuchsia, the multi-coloured pavers and tasteful furniture.

References 

Living people
1970 births
Women Christian religious leaders
20th-century Ugandan people
20th-century Ugandan women
21st-century Ugandan people
21st-century Ugandan women
Ugandan Christians
People from Butambala District